Bristol City Council is a unitary authority and ceremonial county in England. Originally formed on 1 April 1974 as a non-metropolitan district as a result of the Local Government Act 1972 (with initial elections taking place in 1973). It was envisaged that Bristol would share power with Avon County Council, an arrangement that lasted until 1996 when it was made into a unitary authority by the Local Government Commission for England, which abolished the county of Avon and gave Bristol City Council control of Avon Council's responsibilities.

Since 2012 Bristol has had a directly elected mayor, who acts as an executive branch separate from elected councillors.

Elected mayors 

The position of mayor of Bristol was created following the English mayoral referendum on 4 May 2012, in which Bristol was the only city to vote in favour of introducing an elected mayor. The first mayoral election was held in November, being won by George Ferguson.

Council control 
From 2016 all councillors are elected every four years. Prior to that, a third of the councillors were elected every year.

A single party must occupy more than half of the councillor seats to have control. It is possible for a party to control the council without a majority, such as when Labour councillors dissolved their coalition with the Liberal Democrats in February 2009, leaving the Liberal Democrats to form a minority leadership.

Council composition

Council election result maps

See also
Bristol City Council
Bristol City Council elections
Politics of Bristol

References

History of Bristol
Politics of Bristol
Local government in Bristol